Zirabiyeh (also Romanized as Zīrābīyeh, Zīr Ābīyeh, and Zīrābyeh; also known as Zīrīneh) is a village in Almahdi Rural District, Jowkar District, Malayer County, Hamadan Province, Iran. At the 2006 census, its population was 168, in 38 families.

References 

Populated places in Malayer County